This is the list of cathedrals in Belize sorted by denomination.

Anglican
St. John's Cathedral, Belize City (Church in the Province of the West Indies)

Roman Catholic 
Cathedrals of the Roman Catholic Church in Belize:
Holy Redeemer Cathedral, Belize City
Our Lady of Guadalupe Co-Cathedral, Belmopan

See also

List of cathedrals

References

 
Belize
Cathedrals
Cathedrals